Godspower Oboido (born 10 November 1988) is a Nigerian poet and cultural activist. He is the founder of the Nigerian Council for Cultural Diplomacy and Research. His poetic voice has been compared to that of Christopher Okigbo and Leopold Senghor, two all-time leading figures of African poetry and influences that clearly mark Oboido's style of poetry.

Biography

Early life
The last child of his parents, Godspower Oboido was born in Benin City, Edo State, Nigeria. He completed his primary school education in Benin City and went to High Schools in Benin City and Iyede, a small town in Delta State.

Career

Literary career
Godspower Oboido began writing in Lagos after an unsuccessful attempt to pursue a career in film. In the beginning, he wrote many screenplays and stage plays, including "Shut up and sit down" which he self-published. He returned to Benin City where he started writing poetry. He said he had a longing to paint with words and slowly deviated from visual art.

In 2014, Oboido's first book of poetry, Songs of a Chicken Bone was released in Canada.

The poet has been published in The Istanbul Review, Saraba Magazine, African writer, Nathaniel Turner, The Star, and elsewhere. In an article on National Mirror Newspaper, the poet was named alongside seven other writers, as the future of Nigerian Literature.

Songs of a Chicken Bone
Songs of a Chicken Bone, a collection of Oboido's poems, is the poet's first full length poetry book and first book of his to be published traditionally. It was well received in the literary circle. British poet and literary publisher, Chris Emery, author of The Departure and other books, described Oboido's book as "spirited and engaged with the world". Poet, playwright and theatre director, Peter Harvey also wrote that Oboido "has been blessed with wide experience and with the grace to be true to his roots."

Wandering Feet on Pebbled Shores

Oboido's second poetry collection, Wandering Feet on Pebbled Shores, was released in August 2017 by Lamar Literary Press (Beaumont, Texas). In Wandering Feet on Pebbled Shores, Oboido sings of and powerfully negotiates the Africa that is alive and strong alongside the new world where “the traveler washes his migrant feet / with the wetness of dawn” and where “the road has mouth like a boa.”

Talks
The poet has given talks, read his poems and papers at various literary festivals and events at universities and institutions of learning around the world.

Awards
Godspower Samson Oboido is a 2016 Highly commended runner-up in the Queens Young Leaders Award from Her Majesty The Queen Elizabeth II. He is among the selected emerging young leaders from the Commonwealth that will receive a bespoke training delivered by The University of Cambridge for the year 2016. Also, In 2010, he was a finalist in the Future Nigeria Awards, making the list of 100 of the brightest and best Nigerians under the age of 30.

References

Living people
1988 births
21st-century Nigerian poets
Nigerian male poets